Palais Bluff is an ice-free coastal bluff rising to over 400 m between the terminus of Shearwater Glacier and Quaternary Icefall in northwest Ross Island. The bluff overlooks Wohlschlag Bay. At the suggestion of P.R. Kyle, named by Advisory Committee on Antarctic Names (US-ACAN) (2000) after Julie Palais, Program Manager for Glaciology, Office of Polar Programs, National Science Foundation (NSF). As a Ph.D. student at Ohio State University, collected snow samples and short ice core on Ross Island to examine the volcanic record. She has made many trips to Antarctica.

Cliffs of Ross Island